Zsóka Gaál (born 2007) is a Hungarian chess player who holds the title of Woman International Master (WIM). She was the 2021 online World Youth Champion in the under-14 girls' division. She had finished runner-up to Eline Roebers a year earlier. She was also a European Youth Champion in 2016 in the under-10 girls' division. Gaál earned the Woman International Master title in 2021 at 14 years and 2 months old. Her coaches are Gábor Papp and Tamás Bánusz, both of whom hold the title of Grandmaster (GM) and are also from Hungary.

References

Living people
2007 births
Hungarian female chess players
People from Ajka